Events from the year 1815 in the United States.  As news slowly spread of the Treaty of Ghent (1814) ending the War of 1812, battles between American and British forces continued in the early months of the year.

Incumbents

Federal Government 
 President: James Madison (DR-Virginia)
 Vice President: vacant
 Chief Justice: John Marshall (Virginia)
 Speaker of the House of Representatives: Langdon Cheves (DR-South Carolina) (until March 4), Henry Clay (DR-Kentucky) (starting December 4)
 Congress: 13th (until March 4), 14th (starting March 4)

Events
 January 8 – War of 1812 – Battle of New Orleans: American forces under General Andrew Jackson defeat an invading British force.
 February – The Hartford Convention arrives in Washington, D.C.
 February 6 – New Jersey grants the first American railroad charter to a John Stevens.
 February 7–12 – War of 1812 – Second Battle of Fort Bowyer: British forces capture Fort Bowyer near Mobile, Alabama in what will be the last land battle between the Americans and British in the War of 1812. The British halt their advance two days later when informed of the Treaty of Ghent.
 February 15 – War of 1812 – The United States Senate ratifies the Treaty of Ghent.
 February 17 – War of 1812 ends.
 September 23 – The Great September Gale of 1815 is the first hurricane to strike New England in 180 years.
 December 25 – The Handel and Haydn Society, the oldest continuously performing arts organization in the U.S., gives its first performance, at the King's Chapel in Boston.

Undated
 The second wave of Amish immigration to North America begins.

Ongoing
 War of 1812 (1812–1815)

Births
 January 10  John J. McRae, U.S. Senator from Mississippi from 1851 to 1852 (died 1868)
 January 16
 Lemuel J. Bowden, U.S. Senator from Virginia from 1863 to 1864 (died 1864)
 Henry Halleck, general (died 1872)
 January 18
 Henry P. Haun, U.S. Senator from California from 1859 to 1860 (died 1860)
 Richard Yates, U.S. Senator from Illinois from 1865 to 1871 (died 1873)
 January 21 – Horace Wells, dentist; anesthesia pioneer (died 1848) 
 February 3 – Edward James Roye, 5th President of Liberia (d. 1872 in Liberia)
 March 9 – David Davis, U.S. Senator from Illinois from 1877 to 1883 (died 1886)
 April 1 – Henry B. Anthony, U.S. Senator from Rhode Island from 1859 to 1884 (died 1884)
 May 3 – Drusilla Wilson, American temperance leader and Quaker pastor (died 1908)
 May 10 – Henry Bibb, author and abolitionist who was born a slave (died 1854)
 May 18 – Thomas S. Bocock, United States Congressman, Speaker of the Confederate States House of Representatives (died 1891)
 June 1 – Philip Kearny, United States Army officer (died 1862)
 July 13 – James Seddon, 4th Confederate States Secretary of War (died 1880)
 September 1 – Emma Stebbins, sculptor (died 1882)
 September 7 – Howell Cobb, President of the C.S. Provisional Congress (died 1868)
 September 8 – Alexander Ramsey, 2nd Governor of Minnesota from 1860 to 1863 and U.S. Senator from Minnesota from 1863 to 1875 (died 1903)
 September 12 – Richard S. Rust, abolitionist (died 1906)
 September 19 – Charles B. Mitchel, U.S. Senator from Arkansas from 1862 to 1864 (died 1864)
 October 29 – Dan Emmett, songwriter (died 1904)
 November 1 – Crawford Long, American surgeon and pharmacist (died 1878)
 November 12 – Elizabeth Cady Stanton, suffragist (died 1902)
 November 15 – John Banvard, panorama painter (died 1891)
 November 17 – Eliza Farnham, novelist and reformer (died 1864)
 December 31 – George Meade, general (died 1872)

Deaths
 February 24 – Robert Fulton, inventor (born 1765)
 April 21 – Joseph Winston, patriot and Congressman from North Carolina (born 1746)
 May 8 – David Ramsay, Member of the United States Continental Congress from South Carolina (born 1749)
 September 9 – John Singleton Copley, painter (born 1738; died in London)
 September 24 – John Sevier, soldier, frontiersman, politician, and one of the founding fathers of the State of Tennessee (born 1745)
 December 3 – John Carroll, first American Roman Catholic Archbishop (born 1735)

See also
Timeline of United States history (1790–1819)

References

Further reading
 Estimates of the Value of Slaves, 1815. The American Historical Review, Vol. 19, No. 4 (July, 1914), pp. 813–838
 The Embassy to Washington, 1815. Proceedings of the Massachusetts Historical Society, Third Series, Vol. 48, (October, 1914 – June, 1915),
 Charles W. Elliott. Some Unpublished Letters of a Roving Soldier-Diplomat: General Winfield Scott's Reports to Secretary of State James Monroe, on conditions in France and England in 1815–1816. The Journal of the American Military History Foundation, Vol. 1, No. 4 (Winter, 1937–1938), pp. 165–173
 William Bell Wait. Richardson's 'O. K.' of 1815. American Speech, Vol. 16, No. 2 (April, 1941), pp. 85–86+136
 Harold W. Ryan, George Izard. Diary of a Journey by George Izard, 1815–1816. The South Carolina Historical Magazine, Vol. 53, No. 2 (April, 1952), pp. 67–76
 Orville W. Carroll. Mr. Smart's Circular Saw Mill c. 1815. Bulletin of the Association for Preservation Technology, Vol. 5, No. 1 (1973), pp. 58–64
 John Swauger. Pittsburgh's Residential Pattern in 1815. Annals of the Association of American Geographers, Vol. 68, No. 2 (June, 1978), pp. 265–277
 Lilian Handlin. Harvard and Göttingen, 1815. Proceedings of the Massachusetts Historical Society, Third Series, Vol. 95, (1983), pp. 67–87
 Charles E. Kinzer. The Band of Music of the First Battalion of Free Men of Color and the Siege of New Orleans, 1814–1815. American Music, Vol. 10, No. 3 (Autumn, 1992), pp. 348–369

External links
 

 
1810s in the United States
United States
United States
Years of the 19th century in the United States